Sadri is a town and a municipality in Pali district in Rajasthan, India.

Sadri may also refer to:

 Sadri (name)
 Sadri language
 Sadri Abazi
 Bari Sadri a city 
 Chhoti Sadri, a city
 Sadri (clothing)

See also
Sadr (disambiguation)
Sadan (disambiguation)